Christos Christou (born 19 October 1980) is a Cypriot  politician, and the President of the far-right ELAM party since 2008, who serves as a Representative of the Nicosia constituency with ELAM since 2016.

In March 2022, he was confirmed as ELAM's candidate for the 2023 Cypriot presidential election.

Early life and education

Christos Christou was born in Politiko on the 19th of October 1980. His main language is Greek, but he also speaks English. He obtained a degree in radiology at the Technological Educational Institute of Athens. He has also worked at the Nicosia General Hospital and is currently a member of the Pancyprian Association of Technologists-Radiologists and Radiotherapists.

Political career

During his studies in Greece, he was a member of the far-right Popular Association - Golden Dawn political party, and is one of the founders of National Popular Front (founded in 2008). After the first congress of the party, he became its chairman. He was elected MP in the 2016 parliamentary elections for the first time in the Nicosia Constituency with ELAM for the 11th parliamentary term.

As an MP, he is the representative of ELAM in the Parliament of the Republic of Cyprus, deputy chairman of the Parliamentary Committee on Health, member of the Parliamentary Committee on Foreign and European Affairs and the Parliamentary Committee on Institutions, Values and Administration, and member of the Parliamentary Delegation to the Conference of the European Affairs Committees of the Parliaments of the Member States of the European Union

In the 2018 presidential elections, he was a presidential candidate with 5.65% of the vote.

He was re-elected in the 2021 parliamentary elections for the 12th parliamentary term.

In the 2023 presidential elections, he was a presidential candidate with 6.04% of the vote.

References

1980 births
Cypriot politicians
Living people
People from Nicosia District
Candidates for President of Cyprus